AH-2, AH2, or variation, may refer to:

Military 
 Denel AH-2, a former designation of the Rooivalk attack helicopter
 Kawasaki AH-2, a proposed attack helicopter derived from Kawasaki OH-1
 AH-2 Sabre, Brazilian designation for the Mil Mi-35M4 helicopter gunship
 USS Solace (AH-2), United States Navy hospital ship

Other uses 
 AH2, road from Indonesia to Iran
 AH 2, Hijri year 2, lasting 7 July 623 – 26 June 624 in Georgian calendar
 AH2 (biochemistry), see electron acceptor
 (8201) 1994 AH2, a near-earth asteroid

See also 
 Ah2 Music (composing team)
 AH (disambiguation)
 AHH (disambiguation)
 AHAH (AJAX computer programming)
 Ahah (Book of Mormon)